The Independence Dike Swarm is a major Late Jurassic dike swarm extending over  from the eastern Transverse Ranges northward to the east-central Sierra Nevada in southeastern California, United States. It was described in a paper in 1979.

These dikes may be the roots of linear-fissure-array supervolcanoes.

References

Dike swarms
Igneous petrology of California
Geography of Inyo County, California
Geography of Kern County, California
Transverse Ranges
Sierra Nevada (United States)
Geology of Kern County, California
Geology of Inyo County, California